Chaudhry Akhtar Ali Khan is a Pakistani politician who had been a Member of the Provincial Assembly of the Punjab from August 2018 till January 2023. Previously, he was a Member of the Provincial Assembly of the Punjab, from July 2015 to May 2018.

Early life and education
He was born on 1 April 1957.

He graduated in 1978 from University of the Punjab.

Political career
He was elected to the Provincial Assembly of the Punjab as a candidate of Pakistan Muslim League (Nawaz) (PML-N) from Constituency PP-100 (Gujranwala-X) in by-polls held in July 2015.

He was re-elected to Provincial Assembly of the Punjab as a candidate of PML-N from Constituency PP-61 (Gujranwala-XI) in 2018 Pakistani general election.

His brother, Rana Shamshad Ahmad Khan served as the Punjab minister for transport and excise from 2002 to 2008. Akhter Ali Khan's father, Chaudhry Abdul Wakeel Khan served as a member of the Punjab provincial assembly from 1988 to 1992.

References

Living people
Punjab MPAs 2013–2018
1957 births
Pakistan Muslim League (N) MPAs (Punjab)
Punjab MPAs 2018–2023